Mills River Chapel, also known as Mills River United Methodist Church, is a historic Methodist chapel located near Mills River, Henderson County, North Carolina. It was built in 1860–1861, and is a one-story, rectangular, vernacular Greek Revival-style church.  It features a front portico with four, square, recessed panel wooden columns.  Adjacent to the church is the contributing church cemetery, with gravestones dating from as early as 1824.

It was listed on the National Register of Historic Places in 1988.

References

United Methodist churches in North Carolina
Chapels in the United States
Churches on the National Register of Historic Places in North Carolina
Greek Revival church buildings in North Carolina
Churches completed in 1860
Buildings and structures in Henderson County, North Carolina
19th-century Methodist church buildings in the United States
National Register of Historic Places in Henderson County, North Carolina